Abnak may refer to:

Abnak, Iran
Abnak Records